Lena Dunham (born May 13, 1986) is an American writer, director, actress, and producer. She is known as the creator, writer, and star of the HBO television series Girls (2012–2017), for which she received several Emmy Award nominations and two Golden Globe Awards. Dunham also directed several episodes of Girls and became the first woman to win the Directors Guild of America Award for Outstanding Directing – Comedy Series. Prior to Girls, Dunham wrote, directed, and starred in the semi-autobiographical independent film Tiny Furniture (2010), for which she won an Independent Spirit Award for Best First Screenplay. Her second feature film, Sharp Stick, written and directed by Dunham, was released in 2022. Her third film, Catherine Called Birdy, had its world premiere at the Toronto International Film Festival on September 12, 2022. It was released in a limited release on September 23, 2022, by Amazon Studios, prior to streaming on Prime Video on October 7, 2022.In 2013, Dunham was included in the annual Time 100 list of the most influential people in the world. In 2014, Dunham released her first book, Not That Kind of Girl: A Young Woman Tells You What She's "Learned". In 2015, along with Girls showrunner Jenni Konner, Dunham created the publication Lenny Letter, a feminist online newsletter. The publication ran for three years before folding in late 2018.

Dunham briefly appeared in films such as Supporting Characters and This Is 40 (both 2012) and Happy Christmas (2014). She voiced Mary in the 2016 film My Entire High School Sinking Into the Sea, which premiered at the Toronto International Film Festival. On television, aside from Girls, she has played guest roles in Scandal and The Simpsons (both 2015). In 2017, she portrayed Valerie Solanas in American Horror Story: Cult.Dunham's work, as well as her outspoken presence on social media and in interviews, have attracted significant controversy, praise, criticism, and media scrutiny throughout her career.

Early life
Dunham was born in New York City. Her father, Carroll Dunham, is a painter, and her mother, Laurie Simmons, is an artist and photographer, and a member of The Pictures Generation, known for her use of dolls and dollhouse furniture in her photographs of setup interior scenes. Her father is Protestant of mostly English ancestry; whereas her mother is Jewish. Dunham has described herself as feeling "very culturally Jewish, although that's the biggest cliché for a Jewish woman to say." The works of acclaimed Israeli poet Yehuda Amichai helped her to connect with her Judaism. The Dunham family are cousins of the Tiffany family, prominent in the jewelry trade.

Dunham first attended Friends Seminary before transferring in seventh grade to Saint Ann's School in Brooklyn, where she met Tiny Furniture actress and future Girls co-star Jemima Kirke. As a teen, Dunham also won a Scholastic Art and Writing Award. She attended The New School for a year before transferring to Oberlin College, where she graduated in 2008 with a degree in creative writing.

She has a younger sibling, Cyrus, a 2014 graduate of Brown University, who appeared in Dunham's first film, Creative Nonfiction, and starred in her second film, Tiny Furniture. The siblings were raised in Brooklyn and spent summers in Salisbury, Connecticut.

Career
2000s: Oberlin College and early works
While a student at Oberlin College, Dunham produced several independent short films and uploaded them to YouTube. Many of her early films dealt with themes of sexual enlightenment and were produced in a mumblecore filmmaking style, a dialog-heavy style in which young people talk about their personal relationships. In 2006, she produced Pressure, in which a girl and two friends talk about experiencing an orgasm for the first time, which makes Dunham's character feel pressured to do so as well. "I didn't go to film school", Dunham explains. "Instead I went to liberal arts school and self-imposed a curriculum of creating tiny flawed video sketches, brief meditations on comic conundrums, and slapping them on the Internet."

Another early film, entitled The Fountain, which depicted her in a bikini brushing her teeth in the public fountain at Oberlin College, went viral on YouTube. "Her blithe willingness to disrobe without shame caused an outburst of censure from viewers," observed The New Yorker's Rebecca Mead. Dunham was shocked by the backlash and decided to take the video down:

There were just pages of YouTube comments about how fat I was, or how not fat I was," Dunham said. "I didn't want you to Google me and the first thing you see is a debate about whether my breasts are misshapen."Pressures (2006), Open the Door (2007), Hooker on Campus (2007), and The Fountain (2007) were released as DVD extras with Tiny Furniture.

In 2007, Dunham starred in a ten-episode web series for Nerve.com entitled Tight Shots, described by The New York Times Magazine's Virginia Heffernan as "a daffy serial about kids trying to make a movie and be artsy and have tons of sex."

In 2009, Dunham created the Index Magazine web series, Delusional Downtown Divas, which satirized the New York City art scene. The production was unpaid, so Dunham and her friends "pooled their money from babysitting and art-assistant gigs and borrowed some camera gear."

Also in 2009, Dunham premiered Creative Nonfiction—a comedy where she plays Ella, a college student struggling to complete a screenplay—at the South by Southwest Festival in Austin, Texas. She was initially rejected by the festival the year before; she re-edited and successfully resubmitted the film.

 2010–11: Breakthrough with Tiny Furniture 

Dunham had a career breakthrough with her semiautobiographic 2010 feature film Tiny Furniture; the film won Best Narrative Feature at South by Southwest Music and Media Conference, and subsequently screened at such festivals as Maryland Film Festival. Dunham plays the lead role of Aura. Laurie Simmons (Lena Dunham's real-life mother) plays Aura's mother, and Lena's real-life sibling Cyrus plays Aura's on-screen sibling. For her work on Tiny Furniture, Dunham also won an Independent Spirit Award for Best First Screenplay.

The success of Tiny Furniture earned Dunham a blind script deal at HBO. The network set Dunham up with veteran showrunner Jennifer Konner. Konner told Vulture's Jada Yuan that she got involved with Dunham because she was an obsessive Tiny Furniture fan:

I got a copy of Tiny Furniture from [HBO president] Sue Naegle. Actually, [New Girl creator] Liz Meriwether told me about it and said, 'Oh, there's this great movie. This girl, she's 23, she wrote, directed, and starred in it; she's in her underwear the whole time.' And I was like, 'I really don't want to see that.' And then she was like, 'Oh, trust me, it's great.' So Sue gave it to me just because she had it ... I used to, like, give out copies of the movie. But I'd just broken up with my writing partner and couldn't be less interested in the idea of supervising anybody. I really was like, 'I'm going to find my voice, and be on my own.' And then they called me and they were like, 'Oh, the Tiny Furniture girl is doing a show, do you want to supervise her?' And I was like, 'Yes! One million percent. Sign me up. Totally on board.'

Dunham's star was also raised considerably when she was profiled by David Carr in The New York Times; he was later credited with introducing her to Judd Apatow. Apatow watched Tiny Furniture, and was surprised Dunham had also written and directed the film. "I emailed her and told her I thought it was great", Apatow told The Hollywood Reporter. "It turned out she was in the middle of negotiating a deal to develop a show for HBO and that her partner was Jenni Konner, whom I had worked with on Undeclared and a bunch of other projects. They asked me if I wanted to be a part of it, and I was thrilled to jump in."

 2012–17: Mainstream success with Girls and first book 
Dunham's television series, Girls, was greenlit by HBO in early 2011. Three episodes were screened to positive response at the 2012 South by Southwest Festival.

The series follows Hannah Horvath (portrayed by Dunham), a 20-something writer struggling to get by in New York City. Some of the struggles facing Dunham's character Hannah—including being cut off financially from her parents, becoming a writer and making unfortunate decisions—are inspired by Dunham's real-life experiences.

Dunham said Girls reflects a part of the population not portrayed in the 1998 HBO series Sex and the City. "Gossip Girl was teens duking it out on the Upper East Side and Sex and the City was women who [had] figured out work and friends and now want to nail romance and family life. There was this 'hole-in-between' space that hadn't really been addressed," she said. The pilot intentionally references Sex and the City as producers wanted to make it clear that the driving force behind Girls is that the characters were inspired by the former HBO series and moved to New York to pursue their dreams. Dunham herself says she "revere[s] that show just as much as any girl of my generation".

The first season premiered on HBO on April 15, 2012, and received critical acclaim. The New York Times applauded the series, writing that "Girls may be the millennial generation's rebuttal to Sex and the City, but the first season was at times as cruelly insightful and bleakly funny as Louie on FX or Curb Your Enthusiasm on HBO." James Poniewozik from Time reserved high praise for the series, calling it "raw, audacious, nuanced and richly, often excruciatingly funny".

Despite the acclaim, the series also generated significant criticism over its lack of racial representation and Dunham's frequent on-screen nudity.

The first season garnered Dunham four Emmy Award nominations for her roles in acting, writing, and directing the series, as well as two Golden Globe Awards for Best Television Series – Musical or Comedy and Best Actress – Television Series Musical or Comedy. In February 2013, Dunham became the first woman to win a Directors Guild of America Award for Outstanding Directing – Comedy Series for her work on Girls.Girls was renewed for a second season in April 2012, before the first season had finished airing. The finale episode of the first season drew over one million viewers.

The second season of Girls continued to receive critical acclaim. David Wiegland of the San Francisco Chronicle said that "The entire constellation of impetuous, ambitious, determined and insecure young urbanites in Girls is realigning in the new season, but at no point in the four episodes sent to critics for review do you feel that any of it is artificial". Verne Gay of Newsday said it is "Sharper, smarter, more richly layered, detailed and acted". Ken Tucker of Entertainment Weekly felt that "As bright-eyed and bushy-tailed as it was in its first season, Girls may now be even spunkier, funnier, and riskier". The second season ran on HBO from January 2013 to March 2013, with third and fourth seasons subsequently being renewed. The third season of Girls premiered in January 2014 with over one million viewers. The following month, Dunham hosted an episode of Saturday Night Live with musical guest The National.

In late 2012, Dunham signed a $3.5 million deal with Random House to publish her first book. The book, an essay collection called Not That Kind of Girl: A Young Woman Tells You What She's "Learned", was published in September 2014. It reached number two on The New York Times Best Seller list in October 2014.

On January 5, 2015, days before the premiere of the fourth season, Girls was renewed for a fifth season, despite dwindling viewership. That year, Dunham launched A Casual Romance Productions, a production company to develop television and film projects. The company produced It's Me Hilary: The Man Who Drew Eloise. On February 20, 2015, it was reported that Dunham had been cast in a guest role in an episode of the ABC drama series Scandal, which aired March 19, 2015. In September 2015, Dunham stated that the sixth season of Girls was likely to be the last season. This was later confirmed by HBO.

In 2016, Dunham appeared in her mother's film, My Art, which had its world premiere at the 73rd Venice International Film Festival. She also voiced Mary in My Entire High School Sinking Into the Sea, a 2016 American animated teen comedy drama film directed by Dash Shaw. It was selected to be screened in the Vanguard section at the 2016 Toronto International Film Festival. Dunham also filmed scenes for the film Neighbors 2: Sorority Rising, but they were cut from the final film.

In 2017, she portrayed Valerie Solanas, the real-life radical feminist and SCUM Manifesto author who attempted to murder Andy Warhol in the late 1960s, in American Horror Story: Cult.Girls sixth and final season concluded on April 16, 2017, leaving a total of 62 episodes in the series.

 2018–present: Second book, Camping, and other work 
Since 2016, Dunham has been working on a second book that will be published by Random House.

In February 2018, A Casual Romance Productions announced that it would be producing Camping, a remake of the British comedy series of the same name for HBO, with Jennifer Garner in the lead and Dunham and Konner as showrunners and writers. On July 25, 2018, the series held a panel at the Television Critics Association's annual summer press tour featuring executive producer Jenni Konner and cast member Jennifer Garner. The following day, a teaser trailer for the series was released.Camping has been met with a mixed to negative response from critics upon its premiere. On the review aggregation website Rotten Tomatoes, the first season holds a 28% approval rating, with an average rating of 5.1 out of 10 based on 32 reviews. The website's critical consensus reads, "The first season of Camping makes it difficult to determine who the least happy campers are: those on the screen or those watching it." Metacritic, which uses a weighted average, assigned the season a score of 49 out of 100 based on 26 critics, indicating "mixed or average reviews".

In August 2018, it was announced Dunham would appear in the film Once Upon a Time in Hollywood, directed by Quentin Tarantino, which released on July 26, 2019. Dunham portrayed the role of Catherine "Gypsy" Share. In October 2018, coinciding with the expiration of their joint HBO contract, Dunham and Konner split as producing partners, dissolved their production company. In August 2019, Dunham launched a new production company Good Thing Going which has a first look deal with HBO.

In 2019, Lena Dunham and Alissa Bennett started a podcast called The C-Word Podcast produced by Luminary.

In response to the 2020 coronavirus pandemic, in March 2020 Dunham announced she would write a serialized novel, Verified Strangers, as a response to social isolation. She added that the act was a response to help herself and the readers in the time of anxiety. The serialization started later that month on the Vogue website. Dunham directed and served as an executive producer on the first episode of HBO's Industry. That same year, she appeared in The Stand In directed by Jamie Babbit.

In 2021, Dunham had a small role in Music, directed by Sia. She also served as an executive producer on Genera+ion, a dramedy for HBO Max.

In 2022, Dunham's second feature film, Sharp Stick, starring Kristine Froseth, Dunham, and Jon Bernthal, was released to mixed reviews. She also directed, wrote, and produced Catherine Called Birdy, an adaption of the children's novel of the same name by Karen Cushman for Working Title Films.

 In the media 
Dunham has appeared on several magazine covers, including Vogue, Elle, Marie Claire, Popular Mechanics, and Rolling Stone. After Dunham posed with bare legs for Glamour's February 2017 cover, she praised the magazine for featuring an unedited photo and leaving the cellulite on her thighs visible.

Lenny Letter

In 2015, Dunham, with Jenni Konner, co-founded Lenny Letter, a feminist online newsletter. Lenny Letter was initially supported by Hearst Corporation advertising, and subsequently by Condé Nast. In addition to the regular newsletter, Lenny Letter published a Fiction Issue and a Poetry Issue during fall 2015.

Notable articles include an essay written by actress Jennifer Lawrence about the gender wage gap in Hollywood, and one written by singer Alicia Keys about her decision to start wearing little to no make-up.

In November 2017, following Dunham and Konner's controversial letter denouncing Aurora Perrineau's accusation of sexual assault by Murray Miller, Zinzi Clemmons announced that she would no longer contribute to the newsletter, saying Dunham's racism was "well-known" and called for all women of color to "divest" from Dunham.

In October 2018, Dunham and Konner announced that Lenny Letter would be shutting down, reportedly due to a decline in subscribers and failure to build momentum upon other platforms. At its height in 2017, Lenny Letter had over 500,000 subscribers.

Controversies
Dunham's work and her outspoken presence on social media and in interviews have attracted significant controversy, criticism, and media scrutiny throughout her career. On several occasions, Dunham has been accused of making racist remarks.

Upon release, Girls was met with criticism regarding the all-white main cast in the otherwise culturally diverse setting of New York City (the only black actors in the pilot were a homeless man and a taxi driver, and the only Asian actress had the sole trait of being good at Photoshop). Donald Glover guest starred as Sandy, a black Republican and Hannah's love interest, in the first two episodes of season two, which was criticized as tokenism in response to the initial backlash from the first season.

Dunham spoke publicly about the criticism on several occasions; in an interview with IndieWire, she said:

In her book Not That Kind of Girl: A Young Woman Tells You What She's "Learned", Dunham wrote about being sexually assaulted by an Oberlin College classmate, which resulted in controversy regarding the accuracy of her account and a case of mistaken identity when a former Oberlin College student named Barry (the pseudonym used for Dunham's alleged attacker in her book) sought legal advice to ensure people did not associate him with the content. In the book, Dunham describes "Barry" as a man who wore cowboy boots, sported a mustache, hosted a radio show, worked at a campus library, and graduated from Oberlin in 2005; this description was characterized by the attorney of Dunham's former classmate, Aaron Minc, as detailed enough to point towards his client. Dunham later apologized for the confusion and Random House reprinted the book with a disclaimer, releasing a statement saying: "Random House, on our own behalf and on behalf of our author, regrets the confusion."

Other passages in the book recounting interactions of a sexual nature, starting when she was seven years old, with her then one-year-old sibling Cyrus (then called Grace) also attracted significant controversy, and prompted numerous editorials about children's sexuality and personal boundaries.

In September 2016, Dunham criticized NFL player Odell Beckham Jr. for his interactions with her at the Met Gala. Dunham said, "I was sitting next to Odell Beckham Jr., and it was so amazing because it was like he looked at me and he determined I was not the shape of a woman by his standards. He was like, 'That's a marshmallow. That's a child. That's a dog.' It wasn't mean — he just seemed confused. The vibe was very much like, 'Do I want to f--- it? Is it wearing a ... yep, it's wearing a tuxedo. I'm going to go back to my cell phone." She added, "It was like we were forced to be together, and he literally was scrolling Instagram rather than have to look at a woman in a bow tie. I was like, 'This should be called the Metropolitan Museum of Getting Rejected by Athletes'." Dunham was criticized for her comments, which some considered to be an example of white entitlement.The Way Lena Dunham Talks About Black Men Is Peak White Entitlement | HuffPost She later apologized for her characterization of his interactions and thoughts.

In December 2016, Dunham declared on a podcast that she wished she had had an abortion, explaining that she wanted to better understand women who have. The comment was widely condemned as insensitive. Dunham later issued a lengthy apology on her Instagram.

In November 2017, Dunham defended Girls writer Murray Miller, whom actress Aurora Perrineau had accused of sexually assaulting her in 2012 when she was seventeen. Dunham responded to the accusations by saying, "While our first instinct is to listen to every woman's story, our insider knowledge of Murray's situation makes us confident that sadly this accusation is one of the 3% of assault cases that are misreported every year." After an immediate backlash, Dunham apologized for that statement, saying that it was "absolutely the wrong time to come forward with such a statement" and that "every woman who comes forward deserves to be heard, fully and completely, and our relationship to the accused should not be part of the calculation anyone makes when examining her case." Dunham was described as a "hipster racist" for her defense of Miller, as Perrineau is of mixed race. In December 2018, Dunham stated that, contrary to her previous statement, she had no "insider information" that exonerated Murray.

In October 2018, Dunham was hired to write the screenplay for an untitled film based upon the memoir A Hope More Powerful Than the Sea: One Refugee's Incredible Story of Love, Loss, and Survival, by Melissa Fleming, which follows the true story of Doaa Al Zamel, who fled Egypt for Europe and became one of few survivors of a shipwrecked refugee boat, surviving days in open water and supporting herself and two orphaned children with only an inflatable water ring. Steven Spielberg and J. J. Abrams are set to produce the film. Dunham's hiring received backlash from those who felt that, instead of Dunham, a Syrian woman should have been hired. Daniel Medina, a journalist, wrote: "Lena Dunham constantly talks about representation as crucial to enrich storytelling. Yet, in practice, she has shown a disregard for actually elevating those voices. Now, she's been signed on to write a Syrian refugee's story?". Author Alia Malek stated: "The idea that Lena Dunham is better situated to tell the story of a Syrian than somebody else implicit in that is a kind of hierarchy."

Personal life
In 2012, Dunham began dating Jack Antonoff, the lead guitarist of the band fun. and the founder of Bleachers.Lena Dunham and Jack Antonoff Break Up After Five Years |E! News Dunham and Antonoff remained together until December 2017; they subsequently separated announcing that the separation was "amicable". 

Dunham was diagnosed with obsessive compulsive disorder as a child, and continued to take a low dose of an anxiolytic (Klonopin) to relieve her anxiety until 2018. In 2018 Dunham entered rehab for benzodiazpines addiction. In April 2020, she celebrated two years of sobriety without any medical assistance.

In February 2018, Dunham wrote an essay for Vogue about her decision to have a hysterectomy due to endometriosis.

In 2019, Dunham revealed that she suffers from Ehlers-Danlos syndrome.

In July 2020, Dunham reported on Instagram her experience with COVID-19 because she observed people were not taking social distancing seriously. Though she was not hospitalized, she did have "severe symptoms for three weeks".

After a mutual friend set them up on a blind date, Dunham began dating  English-Peruvian musician Luis Felber, in January 2021. In September 2021, Dunham and Felber married in a Jewish ceremony at the Union Club in Soho. Her nine bridesmaids included Taylor Swift, Tommy Dorfman and Myha’la Herrold, and she wore three custom dresses by Christopher Kane throughout the day.

Political activities
Dunham supports Gun control, Immigrant rights, and Gay Rights.

In fall of 2012, Dunham appeared in a video advertisement promoting President Barack Obama's re-election, delivering a monologue, which, according to a blog quoted in The Atlantic, tried to "get the youth vote by comparing voting for the first time to having sex for the first time". Fox News reported criticism from conservatives such as Media Research Center's Lauren Thompson, public relations professional Ronn Torossian, and media trainer Louise Pennell, who labeled the advertisement as tasteless, inappropriate, and a ploy to lure the younger female vote. It included a comment from Steve Hall of Ad Rants saying that "not everyone was so offended." A friend of Dunham said the actress was not paid for her performance on the spot, and Dunham defended the ad by tweeting "The video may be light but the message is serious: vote for women's rights." In The Nation, Ari Melber wrote "the ad's style is vintage Lena: edgy and informed, controversial but achingly self-aware, sexually proud and affirmatively feminist."

In 2014, Dunham was named the Recipient of Horizon Award 2014 by Point Foundation for her support of the gay community.

In April 2016, she wrote in support of Hillary Clinton, pledging to move to Vancouver, British Columbia, Canada, if Donald Trump won the election. Dunham rebuked Trump for the Access Hollywood tape.

After Trump's win, Dunham wrote she will not be moving to Canada, saying, "I can survive staying in this country, MY country, to fight and love and use my embarrassment of blessings to do what's right."

In June 2017, Dunham endorsed Jim Johnson, a Democratic New Jersey gubernatorial candidate. Later that month, Dunham endorsed Jeremy Corbyn, leader of the Labour Party, in the United Kingdom general election.

Filmography

Bibliography

 Books 
 

Essays and reporting
 
 
 
 
 
 
 
 
 

 See also 

 List of Oberlin College and Conservatory people

References

 Further reading 
 
 

 External links 
 
 
 
 Lena Dunham  at Makers: Women Who Make America''

1986 births
21st-century American Jews
21st-century American actresses
21st-century American memoirists
21st-century American screenwriters
21st-century American women writers
Actresses from New York City
American feminists
American film actresses
American people of English descent
American podcasters
American television actresses
American television directors
American television writers
American voice actresses
American women memoirists
American women podcasters
American women screenwriters
American women television directors
American women television producers
American women television writers
Best Musical or Comedy Actress Golden Globe (television) winners
Directors Guild of America Award winners
Jewish American actresses
Jewish American writers
Jewish American film directors
Jewish American screenwriters
Jewish feminists
American LGBT rights activists
Living people
Oberlin College alumni
People from Brooklyn Heights
People with obsessive–compulsive disorder
Saint Ann's School (Brooklyn) alumni
Screenwriters from New York (state)
Showrunners
Television producers from New York City
The New School alumni
The New Yorker people
Women civil rights activists
Writers from Manhattan